Bethel Christian School is a PreK-12 Christian school in Erie, Pennsylvania.

The school was established in 1973.

References

External links

1973 establishments in Pennsylvania
Christian schools in Pennsylvania
Education in Erie, Pennsylvania
Educational institutions established in 1973
Private elementary schools in Pennsylvania
Private middle schools in Pennsylvania
Private high schools in Pennsylvania